Khorgas, officially known as Korgas, also known as Chorgos, Gorgos, Horgos and Khorgos, formerly Gongchen, is a Chinese city straddling the border with Kazakhstan. It is located in the Ili Kazakh Autonomous Prefecture of the Xinjiang Uyghur Autonomous Region. 

The city on the Kazakh side of the border is also known as Khorgas (Khorgos); its train station there is Altynkol.

As of 2019, the Khorgos area was a hub of the New Eurasian Land Bridge, 200 km from the Alataw Pass, the historically important Dzungarian Gate, with a cross-border visa-free special economic zone for trade and shopping (ICBC), a dry port for transporting goods and two new cities, one on either side of the border.

Transportation 
The Jinghe–Yining–Khorgos railway was completed in late 2009 and as of 2012 provides train service from Ürümqi and Yining to Khorgas.

Passenger trains from Ürümqi started on July 1, 2010; however, they initially only ran to Yining and not all the way to Khorgas.
In December 2013, one of the daily Ürümqi-Yining passenger trains was extended to Khorgas. The travel time from Khorgos to Yining then was just over an hour.

In December 2011, a  railway from the Khorgas border crossing to Zhetygen terminal (near Almaty) was completed; on December 2, 2012, the tracks from the Chinese and Kazakhstan sides of the borders were connected. For some months, the railway on the Kazakh side was still operating in a test mode. The railway border crossing (port of entry) at Khorgas became operational in the late 2012;) the first regular trains from the two countries crossed the border on December 22, 2012. Thus, Khorgos, an international dry port, connects land-locked Kazakhstan to the sea port of Lianyungang in China.

The railway border crossing is expected to handle up to 15 million tons of freight per year initially, the volume rising to 30 million tons per year in the long run, opening up the second Europe-China rail link via Kazakhstan.

Khorgas is a major break of gauge interchange. 41-ton gantry cranes are used to move shipping containers between standard gauge Chinese trains and Russian gauge Kazakh trains, connecting to Altynkol railway station on a spur line of Kazakhstan Temir Zholy. 

In June 2017, the Ürümqi Railway Bureau of the China Railway started daily passenger service from Ürümqi to Nur-Sultan via Khorgas.

Economy
In 2017, robot manufacturing moved to Horgos as Boshihao Electronics moved production to the city from Shenzhen.

Climate

Major disasters

 61st Regiment Farm fire (1977) - most deadly fire in China since 1949

See also
 Transport in China
 Transport in Kazakhstan
 Railway stations in China
 Railway stations in Kazakhstan
 Nurkent

Gallery

References 

China–Kazakhstan border crossings
County-level divisions of Xinjiang
Dry ports
Ili Kazakh Autonomous Prefecture
Populated places in Xinjiang